René Tórgarð (born 3 August 1979) is a Faroese international footballer who plays club football for EB/Streymur, as a goalkeeper.

He made his international debut for the Faroe Islands in 2008.

References

External links

1979 births
Living people
People from Tórshavn
Faroese footballers
Association football goalkeepers
Faroe Islands international footballers
B36 Tórshavn players
Argja Bóltfelag players
EB/Streymur players
Faroe Islands Premier League players
Faroe Islands youth international footballers